Pokou is a surname and may refer to:

Laurent Pokou (1947-2016), Ivorian footballer
Queen Pokou (c. 1730–1750), Queen and founder of the Baoule tribe